Staphylococcus vitulinus is a Gram-positive, coagulase-negative member of the bacterial genus Staphylococcus consisting of clustered cocci.  The species was originally isolated from food (beef, chicken, lamb, and other meats) and animals (mammals including horse, vole, and whale) and was named Staphylococcus vitulus.  The name was later changed to Staphylococcus vitulinus for correct Latin grammar.

The species Staphylococcus pulvereri, originally isolated from humans and from a diseased chicken carcass, was later determined to be synonymous with S. vitulinus.

References

External links
Type strain of Staphylococcus vitulinus at BacDive -  the Bacterial Diversity Metadatabase

vitulinus
Bacteria described in 1994